Michel Dragon (1739–1821) also known as Don Michael Dragon or Michael Dracos was a Greek merchant and lieutenant who served in the Spanish Army during the American Revolution, fighting with the Patriots for the independence of the United States of America. He participated in the Gulf Coast Campaign, notably in the Battle of Baton Rouge, Battle of Fort Charlotte and in the Siege of Pensacola where he was in command of the provincial militia. Dragon was one of the first Greek Americans and one of few to fight in the American Revolutionary War. He married a former slave of African descent and they had two children, one of them being Marianne Celeste Dragon.  Both he and his daughter were the subjects of two different portraits by Josef de Salazar.  He was also a businessman and major planter. Dragon and his wife Francoise Chauvin Beaulieu de Monpliaisir were major planters in New Orleans.

Dragon was born in Athens, Greece. He migrated to New Orleans sometime around 1760.  He briefly joined the French militia but then became part of the Spanish military when Spain took over New Orleans.  He fought in the American Revolutionary for the Spanish.  Around 1775, he had a relationship with a former slave named Marie Françoise Chauvin de Beaulieu de Montplaisir.  She belonged to Mr. Charles Daprémont de La Lande, a member of the Superior Council. Marie and Dragon had two children Louise Dragon and Marianne Celeste Dragon.  Dragon became an American revolutionary war hero. He was honored by King Charles III of Spain and given the rank of Lieutenant.  He became a U.S. citizen when Louisiana became part of the United States. Marie Françoise De Montplasi and Don Michel eventually married.  His daughter Marianne Celeste Dragon inherited a massive fortune.

Dragon's family became one of the oldest and most influential Greek families in United States history. His grandson Alexander Dimitry, who was mixed-race due to his mother's partial African ancestry, was the first person of color to attend Georgetown University. He was also the first Greek American and first person of color to become a U.S. Ambassador. His first grand-daughter, Euphrosyne, married Paul Pandely, another native of Greece. Paul's mother, Elizabeth English, was a member of the English royal House of Stuart. His grand-daughter Clino Angelica Dimitry married a prominent Italian surgeon Giovanni Pieri, MD. He was actively involved in the unification of Italy and collaborated with Giuseppe Mazzini to form the first Italian government known as the Roman Republic (1849). Their actions eventually led to the Unification of Italy.

Life
 
Michael Dragon was born in Athens, Greece, in 1739. His father's name was Antonio Dracos and his mother's name was Clino Hellenes.  He married a freed African slave named Marie Francoise Chauvin Beaulieu de Montplasir.  She was the daughter of François Chauvin de Monplaisir de Beaulieu & Marianne Lalande. Dragon and Montplasir had two children Louise Dragon (Dracos) and Marianne Celeste Dragon (Dracos) around 1775.  Four years before the American Revolution.  Louise died at a young age. Dragon and François were married later in life due to the color of her skin and the issues surrounding interracial marriages in New Orleans.  Their only daughter, Marianne, passed as white. She married a Greek immigrant in 1779 named Andrea Dimitry. Marie and Dragon were married on December 30, 1815, at the Saint Louis Church, New Orleans. Dragon was 76 and his wife was Marie François was 59.

Dragon's military career began in the French militia when he migrated to New Orleans from the Greek city of Athens. He later became affiliated with the Spanish military first as a second sergeant, then first sergeant, and finally as a lieutenant.  He served for the Spanish military during the American Revolutionary War.  The first battle was the Capture of Fort Bute in 1779.  Dragon was part of the artillery division under Colonel Gilbert Antoine de St. Maxent.  He fought in the Battle of Baton Rouge, Battle of Fort Charlotte and gradually increased his rank to lieutenant in the Siege of Pensacola under Bernardo de Gálvez. Dragon led the Louisiana provincial militia.  He was later honored by Charles III of Spain upon the recommendation of Baron Francisco Luis Héctor de Carondelet. He continued his service to the Spanish military and Andres Almonaster y Rojas until New Orleans became part of the United States. Dragon and his family then became American citizens and were given several hectares of land as a reward for Dragon's actions in the American Revolution.

According to records of the slave contracts, some of the slaves were bought and sold by people of color and relatives of Marie Francoise Chauvin Beaulieu de Montplasir. Dragon purchased a slave named Cyprion from a freed African American slave owner named Marguerite Monplaisir. Carlota was also a female African American slave owned by Dragon and purchased by a free African American named Francisco Monplaiser.  According to the 1805 New Orleans City Directory, Michel Dragon and his wife resided at 60 Rue de Chartres. Andrea Dimitry and Marianne Céleste Dragon lived next door at 58 Rue de Chartres.  The laws governing black slave ownership and free people of color in New Orleans began to change.

Dragon and his wife died in the early 1820s. He left a vast fortune to his daughter Marianne Celeste Dragon. Dragon's family continued to flourish within the confines of New Orleans. His grandchildren became very important members of the community in New Orleans.

See also
Anti-miscegenation laws in the United States

References

Bibliography

Colonial United States (Spanish)
Spanish military personnel of the American Revolutionary War
1739 births
1821 deaths
18th-century American military personnel
American slave owners
Interracial marriage in the United States
Spanish people of the American Revolution
People from Athens
Greek emigrants to the United States
19th-century Greek Americans
19th-century Greek people
People from New Orleans
18th-century Greek Americans
18th-century Greek people
18th-century Greek businesspeople
19th-century Greek businesspeople
American people of Greek descent